Homer Ocro Nunamaker (May 14, 1889 – May 21, 1964) was an American politician in the state of Washington. He served in the Washington House of Representatives and Washington State Senate.

References

1964 deaths
1889 births
Democratic Party Washington (state) state senators
Democratic Party members of the Washington House of Representatives
20th-century American politicians
People from Greenup, Illinois